Roccellographa is a genus of lichen-forming fungi in the family Roccellographaceae. The genus was circumscribed by Austrian lichenologist Julius Steiner in 1902, with Roccellographa cretacea assigned as the type, and at that time, the only species. Three additional species have since been transferred to the genus from other genera.

Species
Roccellographa circumscripta 
Roccellographa cretacea 
Roccellographa muriformis 
Roccellographa sorediata

References

Arthoniomycetes
Lichen genera
Arthoniomycetes genera
Taxa described in 1902